Morooka (written: 師岡 or 諸岡) is a Japanese surname. Notable people with the surname include:

, Japanese footballer
, Japanese photographer

Fictional characters
, a character in the video game Persona 4
, a character in the visual novel Maji de Watashi ni Koi Shinasai!

Japanese-language surnames